Rhododendron arizelum (夺目杜鹃) is a species of flowering plant in the family Ericaceae. The flowers are white, pale yellow, or pink, with a crimson basal blotch.

References

Sources
 I. B. Balfour & Forrest, Notes Roy. Bot. Gard. Edinburgh. 12: 90. 1920.
 The Plant List
 Flora of China
 Hirsutum

arizelum
Taxa named by Isaac Bayley Balfour
Taxa named by George Forrest (botanist)